The Carnival of Cayenne is the most famous of French Guiana Carnivals. This carnival is renowned around the world for the diversity and originality of its costumes. Together with the Kourou Carnival and the Saint-Laurent Carnival, it is one of the most important carnivals in the region.

This carnival is also known for its parade, the Parade of Cayenne (also called Parade of the Capital), where participate groups invited from Metropolitan France, Suriname, Brazil and Caribbean.

History of the carnival of Cayenne 
This carnival, which is the oldest in French Guiana, belongs to the Guianan Creole culture. It originates from the carnival as it is practiced in Europe. At the beginning of colonization, the settlers practiced carnival, but slaves were forbidden. Braving the ban, the slaves practiced the carnival, in clandestine celebrations. They saw it as a way to regain some freedom, to commemorate fertility and harvests like Africans, and to mock the settlers.
Today the metropolitan, Brazilian and Chinese communities take part.

It has a variable duration fixed by the religious festivals, it takes place between the Epiphany at the beginning of January, and the Ash Wednesday marking the beginning of Lent calculated according to the date of Easter in February or March. It takes place from Friday evening to Monday morning.

The gras days close the carnival, it is Ash Wednesday.

Traditional costumes 

There are several traditional costumes that represent mythical figures of the Guianan carnival.

King Vaval 
Mythical figure of the carnival. He is the king of the carnival. He is inducted at the beginning of the carnival. He dies on Ash Wednesday, to be reborn like the Phoenix the following year.

The Touloulou 

The most famous of the characters. She is a lady dressed elegantly from head to toe. She wears a petticoat, a hood, a domino mask and long gloves, so that one does not see a centimeter of skin. The goal is that the woman disguising in Touloulou is not recognized. She runs in the street but she also participates in masked balls. She represents the bourgeois women of the 18th and 19th centuries.

Negmarons 
These are groups of men wearing a kalimbé (loincloth red and coated with oil and soot. They also have an awara palm seed in the mouth. They seek to put the order (put all the spectators out of the street where the parades take place). They represent fugitive slaves, called chestnuts.

Zonbi baréyé 
The zonbi baréyé (or baré yé) or simply "zonbi" in Guianan Creole is a character appearing a zombie.

the Jé farin 
This costume is all white. It consists of pants, a shirt, a pointed hat and a mask. He reminds everyone of a traditional job: the baker. The tradition is that the children play with him, and in response the farin flourishes them.

Bobi 
Sometimes referred to as Babi or Bubi, it consists of old bags of local brown jute potatoes that cover the body. He is restrained with a leash. It is a hungry bear, it would be inspired by the first showers of bears.

Karolin 
She is a wealthy woman with gold and jewelry worn by her husband on her back. Jealous, she forces him to move like this to protect him from other women.

Lanmò (death) 
he is dressed in white from head to toe, his costume makes it possible to envelop the spectators. This character represents death.

Sousouri (the bat) 
It is a figure dressed in a right-to-the-body winged from head to toe, usually black or two-colored. Rather maleficent and known for her vampire behavior, she pursues passers-by on the street and "spades" and tickles sherl'cy.

Djab rouj (red devil) 
He's a devil dressed in red and black. It is seen in the streets during mardi gras.

Other costumes 
There are also many other costumes, some of which are endangered such as :
 the Annglé bannan,
 the Sweepers,
 the Bèf vòlò bèf,
 the Cane cutters,
 the Djab annan bwèt,
 the Senegalese Tirailleurs,
 the Drainer.

The carnival of the streets 
Every Sunday afternoon (around 3pm), parades take place in the streets of Cayenne (a little earlier normally). Groups disguised according to the theme of the year, parade around decorated floats, to the rhythm of drums, brass and string instruments. The preparation of the groups last several months before the carnival. The groups parade in front of tens of thousands of delighted spectators who are massing on the sidewalks and the stands arranged for the occasion.

The most known groups are:
 Kassialata
 star apple
 Kalajirou
 Piraye
 Reno Band
 Ijakata
 Kouman
 Chiré Ban'n
 Osband
 the Belles de la Madeleine
 Junior City
 Wanted
 Mayouri Tchô-NèG
 Patawa Folia

Brazilian bands, similar to those encountered in the Rio Carnival, are also appreciated for their rhythms and their alluring costumes. The Asian community of French Guiana also participates in the parades bringing its characteristic touch, with dragons.

The carnival of families 

Throughout the carnival, families gather to eat the galette des rois. This is the tradition of the slab of kings known in Europe during the Epiphany, extended throughout the carnival period. Usually, the king pays the cake the following week. The cake can be frangipane, guava or coco.

After the Abolition of slavery in 1848, the economy of Guyana is stricken, a large number of the population lives from the work of the land in "houses". People cultivate the land, we know the value of working together: Mayouri. In French Guiana, it is at this time that the tradition of the cake of the kings is born, or more precisely of the "makes the bouquet". A couple organizes the meal and the party. At the end, he designates the couple who will organize the next meeting by giving him the bouquet.

The paré-masked Ball 

The Dancings, called "Universities" organize masked balls during which the men come to dance with the touloulous. Evenings are held on Friday and Saturday nights depending on the municipality. This tradition is peculiar to French Guiana, it exists nowhere else, but there are now dancings on Paris and some cities of France which organize its balls.

The Tololos Ball is a recent innovation that has only appeared since the 1990s. During these evenings, the men disguise themselves and take on the role of Touloulous (they invite undisguised women to dance). These evenings are becoming increasingly popular and take place several times during carnival, the most important being the last Friday before the fat days.

The carnival dances are the mazurka, the polka, the biguine and the piké djouk. It is the Touloulou which invites the men to dance, they can not refuse. Only the Touloulous have the right to dance, if an undisguised woman dances, the orchestra stops.

The capital has only one university, Nana (Soleil levant).

Carnival Groups 

There are several carnival groups, the most famous are:

 Les Mécènes, who officiate in the hall Polina, their star singer was Bernard Inglis, died in 2002, it remains a pillar of the carnival Guyanese.
 Les Blues Stars, who play at Nana (Soleil levant). Their star singer is Victor Clet, known as Quéquette, so popular that his picture was printed on the bottles of Rhum Saint-Maurice during the carnival of 2006.
 Karnivor, which includes Saul Sylvestre (author, composer) and 18 musicians, Arnaud Champestaing, singer, Nadège Chauvet, singer of the group. At the Lindor ceremony, which rewards the Guyanese artists for their production during the year, the Karnivor group was rewarded with seven Lindor.

The Vidés 
This expression comes from "empty the room" ball. These videos always take place in the early hours of Sunday after Saturday night's par-masked ball and aim to train all the dancers outside, in the street, so that all these revelers end up going home. them.

Initially, there was also always a Vide after the last group of Sunday's street carnival in the early evening. A crowd of young and old followed a truck on which was installed an orchestra that played the rhythms of the carnival.

Unfortunately, some of the videos resulted in violence between gangs of young people from different neighborhoods that had serious consequences. Also, these videos have been banned for a long time.

Today the public of the vidés are mainly made up of amateurs of vidés who get up early in the morning to participate in the emptied.

References

See also

Related articles 
 Carnival in French Guiana
 Touloulou
 French Guiana

External links 

French Guianan culture
Entertainment events in French Guiana
Festivals in French Guiana
Cayenne
Religion in French Guiana